Cantharellus persicinus, the peach or pink chanterelle, is a fungus native to the Appalachian region of eastern North America. Like other popular edible chanterelles, it is a member of the genus Cantharellus.  It is suspected of being mycorrhizal, found in association with oaks and eastern hemlock.

DNA analysis has shown C. persicinus to be a genetically valid species.

References

External links

persicinus
Fungi of North America
Edible fungi
Taxa named by Ron Petersen
Fungi described in 1986